The Chicago White Sox hosted the first Turn Back the Clock game in Major League Baseball on July 11, 1990. The White Sox wore their 1917 home uniforms and turned off the electronic scoreboards.  The Phillies held their first Turn Back the Clock game on June 16, 1991. The Phillies and Reds wore double-knit versions of their 1950 wool-flannel uniforms.

As of the 2018 season, the Phillies' 1973–1988 throwback powder blue uniforms were promoted to alternate uniform status and are worn on Thursday home games. As such, these games are no longer part of the Phillies' "Turn Back the Clock" series.

References

Turn
Retro style
Nostalgia in the United States
Turn